The Complete Recordings Nineteen Thirty-Nine is a 1995 compilation album by Frank Sinatra, containing 21 songs he had recorded when he started his singing career in 1939 with Harry James.

Track listing
 "From the Bottom of My Heart" (Roy Ingraham, Jack Murray)  - 3:13
 "Melancholy Mood" (William Schumann, V. Knight) - 3:03
 "My Buddy" (Gus Kahn, Walter Donaldson) - 2:53
 "It's Funny to Everyone but Me" (Dave Franklin, Isham Jones) - 2:54
 "Here Comes the Night" (Frank Loesser, H. Edelstein, C. Hohengarten) - 2:47
 "All or Nothing at All" (Jack Lawrence, Arthur Altman) - 2:56
 "On a Little Street in Singapore" (Peter de Rose, Billy Hill) - 2:48
 "Who Told You I Cared?" (George Whiting, Bert Reisfeld)  - 2:37
 "Ciribiribin (They're So in Love)" (R. Thaler, Alberto Pestalozza) - 2:25
 "Every Day of My Life" (Harry James, B. Hays, M. Beck)  - 2:55
 "From the Bottom of My Heart" - 3:21
 "Melancholy Mood" - 3:10
 "It's Funny to Everyone but Me"  (w.m. Jack Lawrence) - 2:50
 "All or Nothing at All" - 2:57
 "Stardust" (Hoagy Carmichael, Mitchell Parish) - 3:59
 "Wishing (Will Make It So)" (Buddy DeSylva) - 3:47
 "If I Didn't Care" (Lawrence) - 3:27
 "The Lamp Is Low" (Parish, Rose, Maurice Ravel) - 2:00
 "My Love for You" (Abner Silver, Sid Wayne)  - 2:31
 "Moon Love" [Adapted From Tchaikovsky's 5th Symphony, 2nd Movement] (Mack David, André Kostelanetz) - 2:57
 "This Is No Dream"  (Benny Davis, Ted Shapiro, Tommy Dorsey) - 3:18

1995 compilation albums
Frank Sinatra compilation albums